The Masonic Temple in Paducah, Kentucky was a historic building dating from 1904. It was listed on the National Register of Historic Places in 2002.

Originally constructed by several local Prince Hall Masonic lodges, the building had retail shops on the ground floor, and lodge meeting rooms on the upper floors.  In 1975 the Masons moved to new premises, and the building became purely commercial in nature.  It was still standing in 2002 when nominated for the National Register of Historic Places, but has subsequently been torn down.

References

Masonic buildings completed in 1904
Clubhouses on the National Register of Historic Places in Kentucky
Former Masonic buildings in Kentucky
National Register of Historic Places in McCracken County, Kentucky
Neoclassical architecture in Kentucky
Buildings and structures in Paducah, Kentucky
1904 establishments in Kentucky
Demolished buildings and structures in Kentucky
Buildings and structures demolished in the 2000s
Demolished but still listed on the National Register of Historic Places